Zeze Steven Sessegnon (born 18 May 2000) is an English professional footballer who plays as a defender or midfielder for Charlton Athletic, on loan from Premier League club Fulham.

Club career

Fulham
On 28 June 2017, Sessegnon signed his first professional contract with Fulham, pledging his future to the West London club until 2020. He made his debut on 8 August 2017 in an EFL Cup first round tie against Wycombe Wanderers. He played the full ninety minutes in a Fulham win, playing the last nine minutes on the pitch with brother Ryan. He also featured in the following round two weeks later, a 1–0 home defeat to League One side Bristol Rovers. His first appearance in league football arrived on 16 August 2019 in the Championship versus Huddersfield Town.

Loans
Sessegnon signed a season-long loan deal with Championship club Bristol City on 7 September 2020.

On 31 January 2022, Sessegnon joined EFL League One side Plymouth Argyle on loan for the remainder of the 2021–22 season.

On 5 July 2022, Sessegnon joined League One side Charlton Athletic on loan for the 2022–23 season. On 11 March 2023, Sessegnon scored his first professional goal, scoring the equalising goal in a 1–1 draw between Charlton Athletic and Accrington Stanley.

International career
Sessegnon has represented England at U16 up to U20 level. His one appearance for the U16s came on 4 December 2015 versus Brazil.

Sessegnon was called up to the England squad for the 2017 FIFA U-17 World Cup in India. He featured five times, including a start in the final, as England won the trophy.

March 2018 saw Sessegnon win his first U18 caps, versus Qatar and Argentina respectively. In May 2018, Sessegnon was selected for the U18s squad for the 2018 Panda Cup.

His opening Under-19s call-up came in the following August for friendlies with the Netherlands and Belgium. He scored for the U19s on 14 November versus Moldova.

Sessegnon made his England U20 debut during the opening 2019 Toulon Tournament defeat to Japan on 1 June 2019.

On 30 August 2019, Sessegnon was included in the England U21 squad for the first time and made his debut during the 3–2 2021 U21 Euro qualifying win against Turkey on 6 September 2019.

Personal life
He is the twin brother of fellow professional footballer, and former Fulham team-mate, Ryan. Their older brother Chris plays football at semi-professional level, and they are cousins of Beninese international footballer Stéphane Sessègnon.

Career statistics

Honours
Fulham
EFL Championship play-offs: 2020

England U17
FIFA U-17 World Cup: 2017

References

External links

2000 births
Living people
Footballers from Roehampton
English footballers
England youth international footballers
England under-21 international footballers
Association football defenders
Association football midfielders
Fulham F.C. players
Bristol City F.C. players
Plymouth Argyle F.C. players
Charlton Athletic F.C. players
English Football League players
English twins
Twin sportspeople
Black British sportsmen
English people of Beninese descent
English sportspeople of African descent